Nong Ha (หนองฮะ) is a sub-district of Samrong Thap District (สำโรงทาบ) in Surin Province, Thailand

References

Populated places in Surin province